Bogue Homo or Bogue Homa may refer to:

 Bogue Homo (Chickasawhay River tributary), a stream in Mississippi
 Bogue Homo (Leaf River tributary), a stream in Mississippi
 Bogue Homa (Pearl River tributary), a stream in Mississippi